Parent is a community in northern Quebec, Canada, located within the city of La Tuque and about  north-west of La Tuque's town centre. In 2011, it had a population of 611.

During the summer, it becomes the supply point for several dozen outfitters, and in the winter it is a major centre for the snowmobile industry. The Arbec sawmill, with 150 workers, is the main employer of the region. The Bazin River that flows through town is popular for 5- to 7-day canoe trips that end at the Gatineau River.

History
Parent was founded in 1910 when the National Transcontinental Railway was built through the area. It was named after Simon-Napoléon Parent, Québec Premier from 1900 to 1905 and Chairman of the Board of Transcontinental Railway from 1905 to 1911. In 1913, the Parish of Saint-Thomas was formed and two years later in 1915, the Parent Post Office opened.

In 1947, the Village Municipality of Parent was established. The town was the site of a Pinetree Line radar site (RCAF Station Parent) from 1954 to 1963.

On March 26, 2003, Le Haut-Saint-Maurice Regional County Municipality was dissolved and all its municipalities and unorganized territories, including Parent, were amalgamated into the new city of La Tuque.

References 

Communities in Mauricie
Former municipalities in Quebec
La Tuque, Quebec
Populated places disestablished in 2003